HMS Quail was launched at Deptford in 1817 as the name ship of her class of schooners. She herself may have been cutter-rigged. She was broken up in 1829.

She made a number of seizures of smugglers and their vessels. For other seizures made between 28 December 1820 and 13 December 1821 prize money was paid in June 1822. The next payment was for seizures between 23 February and 10 May 1822. The last payment was for seizures between 9 September 1822 and 10 December 1823.

On 31 January 1822 the Admiralty ordered Quail be renamed Providence; it rescinded the order on 11 April 1822.

Disposal: The "Principal Officers and Commissioners of His Majesty's Navy" offered the "Quail cutter, of 82 tons", "lying at Portsmouth" for sale on 11 July 1827. She did not sell then or on a number of later offer dates. She was finally broken up on 8 April 1829.

Notes

Citations

References
 

1817 ships
Cutters of the Royal Navy
Schooners of the Royal Navy